Prince of Ying may refer to:

Emperor Zhongzong of Tang (656–710), Tang dynasty emperor, known as Prince of Ying (英王) from 677 to 680
Li Ying (prince) (died 737), Tang dynasty prince, known as Prince of Ying (郢王) from 712 to 715
Emperor Wuzong of Tang (814–846), Tang dynasty emperor, known as Prince of Ying (穎王) from 821 to 840
Zhu Yougui ( 888–913), Later Liang dynasty emperor, known as Prince of Ying (郢王) from 907 to 912
Chen Yucheng ( 1837–1862), general and prince of the Taiping Heavenly Kingdom, known as Prince of Ying (英王) after 1859

See also
Prince Ying (disambiguation) for Qing dynasty princely peerages